Bald Mountain, in Humboldt County, California, is located at  11.4 miles east of Arcata that rises to an elevation of .

References 

Mountains of Humboldt County, California
Mountains of Northern California